Wali (Waali, Wala) is a Gur language of Ghana that is spoken mainly in and nearby the town of Wa Upper West Region, Ghana.

References

Oti–Volta languages
Languages of Ghana